Protected Spatial Cultural-Historical Units (/) are the monuments in the Republic of Serbia that have the third level of the State protection.

Those are part of the Cultural Property of Great Importance protection list.

References

Further reading 
 Просторне културно-историjске целине at www.spomenicikulture.mi.sanu.ac.rs

See also 
 Cultural Property of Great Importance
 Serbian culture

Serbian culture
Monuments and memorials in Serbia
Cultural heritage of Serbia